Cutro is a town and comune in the province of Crotone, Calabria region, Italy. It's called "City of chess". It is the place of birth of Vincenzo Iaquinta, World Cup-winning footballer who played for Serie A club Juventus.

History

Cutro was a Greek colony of Magna Graecia, with the name of Kyterion.

It obtained the title of city in 1575 by the Spanish King Philip II, after the local chess champion Giò Leonardo Di Bona had won a contest at the Spanish court, become first international winner of chess.

Cutro was destroyed by an earthquake on March 8, 1832. It remained the most populous centre of the region until the mid-20th century, when a strong emigration flow towards Germany and northern Italy (especially in Reggio Emilia) reduced the number of inhabitants  considerably.

Current Day

The population in Cutro (as of 2017) is 10,575

Notable people 
 Giovanni Leonardo Di Bona (1st international chess tournament champion)
 Vincenzo Iaquinta (footballer)
 Rino Gaetano (Songwriter, born in Crotone, from a Cutro family)

References

External links
Italian Wikipedia article

Cities and towns in Calabria